Dmitriy Anatolyevich Golovastov (Russian: Дмитрий Анатольевич Головастов; born 14 July 1971 in Moscow) is a Russian former track and field sprinter who specialised in the 400 metres. He competed at the 1992 and 2000 Summer Olympics, as well as three outdoor and three indoor World Championships.

His personal bests in the event are 45.26 seconds outdoors (Yokohama 2000) and 46.45 seconds indoors (Turin 1996).

Competition record

References

All-Athletics profile

1971 births
Living people
Athletes from Moscow
Russian male sprinters
Soviet male sprinters
Olympic male sprinters
Olympic athletes of the Unified Team
Athletes (track and field) at the 1992 Summer Olympics
Olympic athletes of Russia
Athletes (track and field) at the 2000 Summer Olympics
Goodwill Games medalists in athletics
Competitors at the 1994 Goodwill Games
World Athletics Championships athletes for Russia
European Athletics Championships medalists
Russian Athletics Championships winners